Wing Tek Lum (Chinese: 林永得; born November 11, 1946 Honolulu, Hawaii) is an American poet. Together with a brother he also manages a family-owned real estate company, Lum Yip Kee, Ltd.

Life
He graduated from Brown University  in 1969, where he majored in engineering. He edited the university’s literary magazine.

He graduated from the Union Theological Seminary, with a master's degree in divinity in 1973.
He worked as a social worker, and met Frank Chin.
In 1973, he moved to Hong Kong to learn Cantonese.
His work appeared in New York Quarterly. Under the guidance of Makoto Ooka, he participated with Joseph Stanton and others in the collaborative renshi poem What the Kite Thinks.

Awards
 1970 Poetry Center Award (now known as the Discovery/The Nation Award)
 1988 American Book Award
 2013 Elliot Cades Award for Literature

Works

Anthologies

References

External links
"WING TEK LUM", Asian-American Poets

"One Should Not Sleep Anymore: Poet Wing Tek Lum and the Virtues of Unpleasantness": review by Ken Chen for New York Foundation for the Arts

American male poets
1946 births
Writers from Honolulu
Brown University alumni
Punahou School alumni
Union Theological Seminary (New York City) alumni
Living people
Hawaii people of Chinese descent
American Book Award winners